The United Progressive Alliance (UPA), the governing alliance in India elected in 2004, faced its first confidence vote in the Lok Sabha (the lower house of Parliament) on 22 July 2008 after the Communist Party of India (Marxist)-led Left Front withdrew support over India approaching the IAEA for the Indo-US nuclear deal. The vote was so crucial that the UPA and the opposition parties summoned MPs from their sick beds and even from prison cells to take part in the vote, which was eventually won by the Government.

Before the vote 
The following list indicates the official position of the political parties before the voting.

UPA and supporters: 268 MPs for the government 
NDA and others: 263 MPs against the government 
Undecided: 11 MPs 
Non-voting: 1 MP

Voting 

In the 543 member Lok Sabha, the UPA needed 272 votes for the government to enjoy a simple majority. The UPA won the confidence vote with 275 votes to the opposition's 256, (10 members abstained from the vote) to record a 19-vote victory.

Abstentions 
Ten members abstained from the voting despite some of them having received strict contrary instructions from their parties. 
Among the 10, 2 MPs followed their party decision of abstaining so as to not be seen as supporting the UPA or the BJP, Left led opposition. Those two were:
Trinamool Congress: Mamata Banerjee and
Mizo National Front: Vanlalzawma.

The other eight members who abstained defied their party stand. These eight were:  
Bhartiya Janata Party: Chandrabhan Singh, Manorama Madhavaraj, Kishan Lal Diler and Bahubhai Katara
Shiromani Akali Dal: Sukhdev Singh Libra
Janata Dal (United): P.P. Koya
Shiv Sena: Tukaram Ganpatrao Renge Patil
Telugu Desam Party: D K Audikesavulu

Cross voting

The seven members of the UPA who cross-voted against the government were:
Samajwadi Party: Chaudhary Munawwar Hasan, S.P. Singh Baghel, Rajnarayan Budholia, Jaiprakash Rawat, Ateeq Ahmed and Afzal Ansari.
Indian National Congress: Kuldeep Bishnoi

Conversely, there were at least four members of the opposition who cross-voted in favour of the government proposal. These 4 were
Bhartiya Janata Party: Hari Singh Rathod and H.T. Sangliana.
Biju Janata Dal: Hari Har Swain
Janata Dal (United): Ramswaroop Prasad

Allegations of bribery

Three BJP MPs – Ashok Argal (Morena), Faggan Singh Kulaste (Mandla) and Mahavir Bhagora (Salumber) amidst discussion walked towards the Speaker Somnath Chatterjee and placed two brown and black leather bags on a table. Amar Singh denied the charges. Speaker Somnath Chatterjee asked the police chief of New Delhi to investigate the bribery issue. Indian news channel CNN IBN which carried out the sting operation by recording using hidden cameras agreed to share the material with Indian authorities. A joint parliamentary committee formed to investigate the issue submitted its report to the Lok Sabha on 15 December 2008, after finding no evidence for bribery against the MPs Amar Singh and Ahmad Patel, thereby exonerating them.

Expulsions 
As a result of not obeying the instructions issued by their political parties, many MPs were expelled as an aftermath of the vote.

 The speaker of the house, Somnath Chatterjee of the Communist Party of India (Marxist) was expelled from his party on 23 July 2008.
 The Bhartiya Janata Party expelled all its eight members who defied party guidelines by cross voting and abstentions during the vote of confidence. The leader of the party L.K Advani also said that 22 July should go down as a black day in parliament history.
 The Telugu Desam Party has reported that disciplinary action against two of its MPs, D K Adikeshavulu Naidu and M Jagannadham, would be taken as they voted in support of UPA government, though there were reports of abstention by Adikeshavalu Naidu.
 The Biju Janata Dal expelled its MP, Harihara Swain for voting in favour of government.
 The Shiromani Akali Dal has asked for an explanation from its MP who abstained from voting.

Animal sacrifice
 It was reported that the Samajwadi Party MLA from Lanji Kishore Samrite sacrificed 319 animals – 302 goats, 17 buffaloes – in a 10-day-long yajna for appeasing the Goddess Kamakhya in order for UPA to win the trust vote. Samrite also offered another 'yajna' at Ugratara temple in the city and sacrificed two buffalos there. He spent about 17 lakh on the yajna, and self-confessed to have done it before several times, in distress.

External links to speeches
 Dr. Manmohan Singh's speech
 P.Chidambaram's speech

References

Lok Sabha vote of confidence
Lok Sabha vote of confidence
Political history of India
14th Lok Sabha
Manmohan Singh administration
Motions of no confidence
July 2008 events in India